The 1939 Detroit Tigers season was a season in American baseball. The team finished fifth in the American League with a record of 81–73, 26 games behind the New York Yankees.

Regular season

Season standings

Record vs. opponents

Notable transactions 
 May 13, 1939: Vern Kennedy, Bob Harris, George Gill, Roxie Lawson, Chet Laabs, and Mark Christman were traded by the Tigers to the St. Louis Browns for Red Kress, Beau Bell, Bobo Newsom, and Jim Walkup.

Roster

Player stats

Batting

Starters by position 
Note: Pos = Position; G = Games played; AB = At bats; H = Hits; Avg. = Batting average; HR = Home runs; RBI = Runs batted in

Other batters 
Note: G = Games played; AB = At bats; H = Hits; Avg. = Batting average; HR = Home runs; RBI = Runs batted in

Pitching

Starting pitchers 
Note: G = Games pitched; IP = Innings pitched; W = Wins; L = Losses; ERA = Earned run average; SO = Strikeouts

Other pitchers 
Note: G = Games pitched; IP = Innings pitched; W = Wins; L = Losses; ERA = Earned run average; SO = Strikeouts

Relief pitchers 
Note: G = Games pitched; W = Wins; L = Losses; SV = Saves; ERA = Earned run average; SO = Strikeouts

Farm system

References

External links

1939 Detroit Tigers season at Baseball Reference

Detroit Tigers seasons
Detroit Tigers season
Detroit Tigers
1939 in Detroit